Z Living (formerly Veria Living) is an American digital cable and satellite television network. The channel previously focused on health and wellness programming, but after a 2020 ownership change from Essel Group to NIA Broadcasting (owned by former Equity Media Holdings and Luken Communications executive Neal Ardman), the network shifted focus to classic TV series (much of it shared by family-oriented sister network FOLK TV (now BINGE)) and low-profile contemporary entertainment and lifestyle programming from independent producers.

Z Living is available to 21 million households in America as of October 2018.

On May 17, 2021, Dish Network removed the channel from its channel lineup.

Programming

Current 

 21 Jump Street
 Acapulco H.E.A.T. The Adventures of Ozzie & Harriet Annie Oakley The Beverly Hillbillies Bonanza The Carol Burnett Show Championship Wrestling from Hollywood The Commish Conan the Adventurer Daily Flash Danger Man Fish the Dish Four Star Playhouse Havin' a Beer with Mike Hunter I Married Joan The Jim Bakker Show Josh Lambo's Rona Workouts Live with Martin Gramatica and Rock Riley The Lucy Show My Little Margie Mystery Science Theater 3000 Namaste Nashville Insider Petticoat Junction The Red Skelton Show Route 66 The Saint Silk Stalkings Space: 1999 Tarzan Tarzan: The Epic Adventures Wiseguy Former 

 Altar'd Bedside Manor The Big Fat Truth Birth Days Cook Like a Chef Chasing the Yum Desperate for a Miracle The Doctors The Dr. Oz Show Dueling Doctors Empty Nesters Family Food Challenge Family Style with Chef Jeff Flip My Food Good Food America Health Soup Hemsley+Hemsley I Beat the Odds Junk Brothers The Juice License to Grill The Lisa Oz Show Myth Defying with Dr. Holly Peggy K's Kitchen Cures Nirmala's Spice World Naturally Beautiful Road Grill Rock Your Yoga Spencer's Big 30 Sweat the City Urban Vegetarian Workout From Within with Jeff Halevy What Would Julieanna Do? Yoga Girls Yoga For Life''

External links
Official Website

Television channels and stations established in 2007
English-language television stations in the United States